This list of tallest buildings in El Paso ranks skyscrapers and high-rises in the U.S. city of El Paso, Texas by height. The second-tallest building in the city is the Wells Fargo Plaza, this tower was the tallest building in El Paso for 50 years from 1971 to 2021.

The Anson Mills Building, which is considered to be one of the city's first skyscraper, was completed in 1911. This 12-floor,  structure stood as the tallest in El Paso until 1921. The city went through a building boom in the 1960s and 1970s, during which El Paso saw the completion of most of its tallest buildings, including the Wells Fargo Plaza and One San Jacinto Plaza. The city is going through another major building boom and many revitalization projects have been completed recently or are currently in progress in downtown. However, no El Paso buildings are among the tallest in the United States.

The most recently completed skyscraper in El Paso is the WestStar Tower, which rises  and has 20 floors.



Tallest buildings
Only completed buildings and under construction buildings that have been topped out are included.

Under construction
This list includes skyscrapers that are currently under construction in El Paso.

Proposed
This list includes skyscrapers that are either Proposed or actively Under Design Review in El Paso.

References

External links
 Diagram of El Paso Skyscrapers on SkyscraperPage

El Paso
El Paso